Cardiff City Football Club is a Welsh professional association football team based in Cardiff. The club was founded in 1899 and initially played in local amateur leagues before joining the English football league system. After spending a decade in the Southern Football League, Cardiff joined the Football League in 1920. In April 1912, Jack Evans became the first Cardiff player to be capped in an international match when he played for Wales against Ireland. George Latham was the only other Cardiff player to play in an international match before the First World War. Fred Keenor was the first player to win a cap after the war, in March 1920, while Jimmy Blair became the first Cardiff player to represent a country other than Wales when he played for Scotland against Ireland later the same year. Bert Smith became the first Irish international at the club the following year. Keenor attained 31 caps during his time with Cardiff, becoming the club's highest capped player prior to the Second World War. Goalkeeper Tom Farquharson remains the only Cardiff player to have appeared for two international sides, having represented both Ireland and the Irish Free State in the 1920s.

Alf Sherwood became the club's highest capped international player following the end of the Second World War. Having made his debut for Wales in 1946, he surpassed Keenor's total and amassed 39 caps while a Cardiff player. Wales qualified for its first major international tournament at the 1958 FIFA World Cup. Five Cardiff players were selected in the nation's 23-man squad for the competition: Colin Baker, Ron Hewitt, Ken Jones, Derrick Sullivan and Graham Vearncombe. Sullivan became the first Cardiff player to feature in a World Cup during Wales' opening fixture against Hungary. Baker and Hewitt also played in the competition, while goalkeepers Jones and Vearncombe remained unused reserves. In 2003, Australian defender Tony Vidmar became the first Cardiff player to represent a country from outside the British Isles. The final nation of the British Isles to have a representative from Cardiff was England, when Jay Bothroyd won a single cap in 2010. Icelandic midfielder Aron Gunnarsson overtook Sherwood to become the club's most capped international player in 2016. He went on to win 62 caps before leaving the club in 2019.

A total of 123 players have won at least one cap in senior international football while playing for Cardiff, representing 25 nations. Chris Gunter is the youngest Cardiff player to win an international cap, having represented Wales in 2007 at the age of 16. Kenwyne Jones has scored more international goals than any other Cardiff player. He scored ten times for Trinidad and Tobago between 2014 and 2016.

Key
Players are arranged by alphabetical order of surname.
Appearances as a substitute are included. This feature of the game was introduced in the Football League at the start of the 1965–66 season.
Statistics are correct as of 13 May 2022.

Players

Notes

References
Bibliography 
 

 

Specific 
 

Cardiff City F.C.
Internationals
 Internationals
Association football player non-biographical articles
Cardiff